The Shape of Water is a 2017 American romantic fantasy film directed and produced by Guillermo del Toro. The film, written by del Toro and Vanessa Taylor, follows a mute custodian at a high-security government laboratory who falls in love with a captured humanoid amphibian creature. It stars Sally Hawkins, with Michael Shannon, Richard Jenkins, Doug Jones, Michael Stuhlbarg, and Octavia Spencer in featured roles. Alexandre Desplat composed the film's musical score, while Paul Denham Austerberry, Jeff Melvin, and Shane Vieau were responsible for the production design.

The film premiered at the 74th Venice International Film Festival on August 31, 2017, where it won the Golden Lion. Following successful screenings at the Telluride Film Festival, the Toronto International Film Festival, and the BFI London Film Festival, Fox Searchlight gave the film a limited release in New York City on December 1 before its official wide release in the United States on December 8. The film earned a worldwide box office total of more than $195 million. Rotten Tomatoes, a review aggregator, surveyed 454 reviews and judged 92% to be positive.

The Shape of Water garnered several awards and nominations with particular praise for del Toro's direction, the cast, Desplat's score, and the production design. The film earned thirteen nominations at the 90th Academy Awards, and went on to win four awards, including Best Picture and Best Director. It is the second fantasy film to win Best Picture after The Lord of the Rings: The Return of the King (2003). It received twelve nominations at the 71st British Academy Film Awards, winning three awards, including Best Direction, Best Original Music, and Best Production Design. At the 75th Golden Globe Awards, the film earned seven nominations, winning Best Director and Best Original Score.

At the 29th Producers Guild of America Awards, The Shape of Water won for Best Theatrical Motion Picture. Del Toro won Outstanding Directing – Feature Film at the 70th Directors Guild of America Awards. The film received fourteen nominations at the 23rd Critics' Choice Awards and won four awards including Best Picture. In addition, the American Film Institute selected it as one of the top 10 films of the year.

Accolades

See also
 2017 in film

Notes

References

External links 
 

Lists of accolades by film